Dmitry Yefremov may refer to:

 Dmitry Yefremov (footballer, born 1974), Russian football player and coach
 Dmitry Yefremov (footballer, born 1991), Russian football player
 Dmitry Yefremov (footballer, born 1995), Russian football player